The following television stations operate on virtual channel 42 in Canada:

 CFTF-DT-1 in Edmundston, New Brunswick
 CHNB-DT-14 in Charlottetown, Prince Edward Island
 CHNM-DT in Vancouver, British Columbia
 CITS-DT-1 in Ottawa, Ontario
 CKVP-DT in Fonthill, Ontario

42 virtual TV stations in Canada